Licor de oro (English: Gold liqueur) is a typical Chilotan liqueur made of aguardiente and whey. The other ingredients are saffron and lemon peel.

Chiloé Archipelago
Chilean alcoholic drinks
Liqueurs